Jacob Allen Abel (born November 18, 1987) is an American actor. He has appeared in the film adaptations of the young adult novels Percy Jackson (2010–2013), I Am Number Four (2011), and The Host (2013), along with portraying musician Mike Love in the biographical drama Love & Mercy (2014). Outside of film, he appeared in the recurring role of Adam Milligan on the CW series Supernatural (2009–2010; 2019–2020). Abel was also a series regular in the first season of the Netflix science fiction drama Another Life (2019).

Life
Abel was born in Canton, Ohio, the son of Kim and Mike Abel. He has a brother, Shaun.

Abel married Allie Wood, a writer, on November 9, 2013. They released an album together, Black Magic, in March 2013.

On June 15, 2019, the couple announced on Instagram that they were expecting their first child. They suffered a stillbirth in November 2019.

In February 2021, Wood gave birth to their son.

Career 
His first credited role was in the Disney Channel Original Movie Go Figure, playing Spencer. He later had a recurring guest role on CBS's short lived science fiction series, Threshold. He had numerous guest starring roles including Cold Case and ER. He was honored with a Rising Star award at the 16th Hamptons International Film Festival in October 2008 for his work in the film Flash of Genius. In 2009, Abel shortly appeared in the Peter Jackson film The Lovely Bones based on Alice Sebold's novel. He also had a regular role in the web series Angel of Death which ran for 10 episodes.

In February 2009, Abel was cast in The CW hit series Supernatural playing Adam Milligan, half-brother to series protagonists Dean and Sam Winchester; and appearing in three episodes as both Adam and the Archangel Michael possessing Adam. In 2010, Abel had a role in the film adaptation of Percy Jackson & the Olympians: The Lightning Thief playing Luke Castellan which released on February 12, 2010 (later returning in the sequel, Percy Jackson & the Olympians: The Sea of Monsters, which was released on August 7, 2013). Afterward in 2011, Abel starred in the live-action film I Am Number Four playing Mark James. Abel starred on the social thriller film Inside co-starred by Emmy Rossum which release on July 25, 2011. He also appeared on ABC's medical drama Grey's Anatomy in the episode "Poker Face", playing Tyler Moser.

In 2012, Abel was chosen to play Ian O'Shea in the film adaptation of The Host (2013), based on Stephenie Meyer's eponymous novel.

Abel reprised his role on Supernatural on the eighth and nineteenth episodes of the fifteenth and final season.

Abel was cast as the audiobook voice narrator for Midnight Sun, published by Stephenie Meyer on August 4, 2020.

In November 2022 it was confirmed that Abel would be joining the cast of Walker, reuniting with Jared Padalecki. His character, Kevin, made his first appearance in episode 6 of season 3.

Filmography

Film

Television

Web series

Audiobook narration/Voice talent

References

External links

Jake Abel Online 
 

1987 births
21st-century American male actors
Male actors from Ohio
American male film actors
Male models from Ohio
American male television actors
Living people
Actors from Canton, Ohio